Charles William Maxwell Heddle (1812 – 29 April 1889 Cannes) was a Scottish-Sierra Leonian businessman and shipowner. In 1870 he retired to France where he died in 1889.

Born in Sierra Leone in 1812, Charles was the illegitimate son of John Heddle from Kirkwall and Sophy Bouchier of Sierra Leone. His father died before he was born. Charles was educated in Kirkwall and at the Dollar Academy and in  Edinburgh. He first set up in business in Banjul (Bathurst) in the Gambia in 1834. He returned to Sierra Leone a few years later. Here he helped his uncle Robert Heddle grow his business into one of the most successful businesses in the country. The company branched out from trading in peanuts to owning ships and running a shipping company.

Charles Heddle bought Heddle's Farm on 23 April 1859. He subsequently sold it to the government.

He was a cousin of Matthew Forster Heddle.

References

1812 births
1889 deaths
19th-century Scottish businesspeople
People educated at Dollar Academy
Scottish people of Sierra Leonean descent
Sierra Leonean people of Scottish descent